The Stud Farm is a 1978 Hungarian drama film directed by András Kovács. It was entered into the 29th Berlin International Film Festival.

Cast
 József Madaras - Busó Jani
 Ferenc Bács - Bazsi
 Ferenc Fábián - Busó Mátyás
 András Ambrus - Muran Mihály, altiszt
 Csongor Ferenczy - Kisbáró
 István Gyarmati
 András Csiky - Ághy
 Levente Bíró - Kábik, állatorvos
 Marianna Moór - Kati, kocsmárosnõ (as Moór Marianne)
 Erzsi Pásztor
 Irén Bordán - Erzsi
 Ilka Petur - A Busó testvérek anyja
 Sándor Horváth - Kristóf Máté, párttitkár
 Károly Sinka - Schobert
 Nándor Tomanek - Braun, agronómus

References

External links

1978 films
Hungarian drama films
1970s Hungarian-language films
1978 drama films
Films directed by András Kovács